The 2008 United States motorcycle Grand Prix was the eleventh round of the 2008 MotoGP championship. It took place on the weekend of July 18–20, 2008, at the Laguna Seca circuit. It was an eventful race between Valentino Rossi and Casey Stoner where the lead was hotly contested between the two. On lap 23, with Rossi leading after a controversial pass down the corkscrew, Stoner entered into the last corner too deep and ended up in the gravel trap. Rossi retained his lead for the remainder of the race while Stoner managed to finish in second place despite his mistake. Rossi won for the first time at Laguna Seca and Stoner set a new lap record with a time of 1:21.488.

As usual, only the MotoGP class was permitted to race at Laguna Seca due to the Californian air pollution law prohibiting two-stroke engines in the state.

MotoGP classification

Championship standings after the race (MotoGP)

Below are the standings for the top five riders and constructors after round eleven has concluded.

Riders' Championship standings

Constructors' Championship standings

 Note: Only the top five positions are included for both sets of standings.

References

External links

United States motorcycle Grand Prix
United States
United States Motorcycle Grand Prix
United States Motorcycle Grand Prix